Bradford Vaughan (born 14 June 1975) is a South African professional golfer. He won the South African Amateur in 1994 and turned professional the following year. He has won eight tournaments on the Sunshine Tour. He has also been a member of the Challenge Tour in Europe and has played in various European Tour events.

Professional wins (8)

Sunshine Tour wins (8)

Sunshine Tour playoff record (1–2)

Playoff record
European Tour playoff record (0–1)

Results in major championships

Note: Vaughan only played in The Open Championship.
CUT = missed the half-way cut

Team appearances
Amateur
Eisenhower Trophy (representing South Africa): 1994

External links 

South African male golfers
Sunshine Tour golfers
European Tour golfers
Golfers from Johannesburg
White South African people
1975 births
Living people